Joseph D. Williams, born in Lebanon, Connecticut in 1818, was the twelfth Adjutant General of the State of Connecticut.  He was elected to the Connecticut State Legislature, and was appointed Adjutant General in 1855. He was a member of the Connecticut Historical Society, Good Templars, and son of the American Revolution, and he was a Republican.

Military career
At the age of 18 Williams enlisted in the East Hartford Artillery Company.  In 1855, he was elected as Connecticut Adjutant General by Governor W. T Minor after the last two Adjutants resigned early because they did not agree with orders coming from Minor. Williams was overwhelmed with the Civil War recruiting and logistical demands and resigned in 1863.

Personal life
He attended public schools in Hartford.

References

Military personnel from Connecticut
Connecticut Adjutant Generals
1818 births
Year of death missing
People from Lebanon, Connecticut